The Evening Times Champions Cup, the name of the current version, is an association football trophy for clubs of the Junior level in the western part of Scotland. Sponsored by the Glasgow-based newspaper the Evening Times (now branded as Glasgow Times) since its inception, the trophy has been competed for since 1896 and has been recommissioned under many different guises throughout its history. It was originally awarded annually as a league championship trophy, but has latterly been contested in a Super Cup style format for winners of various league divisions and local cups in the region.

Glasgow Junior League (1896–1927) 

The original purpose of the trophy was that it would be presented to the winners of the Glasgow Junior League since the inception of competition in 1895–96.

The inaugural winners of the trophy Cambuslang Hibernian would later have its name inscribed on the trophy.

Scottish Intermediate League (1927–31) 

After the intermediate dispute of 1925, the trophy was awarded to the champions of the breakaway Scottish Intermediate League from 1927–28.

The destination of the trophy was determined in a play-off match between the Eastern and Western divisional winners.

Central Junior Football League (1931–2002)

1931–1968 
As of 1931–32, the overall winners of Central Junior League were awarded the trophy.

The trophy was presented to the league champions in seasons with a single division. The Eastern and Western (or 'A' and 'B') division winners would commence to a play-off for the trophy. Semi-finals were required if there were seasons with more than two divisions.

1968–1979 
The Lanarkshire regional league was absorbed into a new Central region set-up as part of a major restructure ahead of season 1968–69.

The winners of new three-division setup, with Lanarkshire clubs included, would progress to a play-off system for the trophy. The 'B' and 'C' Division winners competed for place in the final against the 'A' Division winners.

Evening Times Cup Winners' Cup (1979–2018)

1979–1982 
Rebranded as the Evening Times Cup Winners' Cup, the trophy was decided in a play-off system between the winners of Division A, Central League Cup, Sectional League Cup, and McLeod Trophy.

1982–2002 
As well as the Sectional League Cup and Central League Cup winners, entry to the compensation was expanded to include all divisional champions of the Central region.

2002–2012 

Another major restructure took place in 2002, with the Ayrshire and Central regional leagues merged to create the new SJFA West Region setup.

Entry was now permitted to the five divisional champions and five winners of the cup competitions of the West setup.

Evening Times Champions Cup (2012–) 
As of 2012–13, it was renamed the Evening Times Champions Cup. Entry into the competition was restricted to the five league winners of the West region.

As of 2018–19, the competition would be moved to the beginning of the following season.

Notes

References 

1896 establishments in Scotland
Football cup competitions in Scotland
Scottish Junior Football Association, West Region
Annual sporting events in the United Kingdom
Annual events in Scotland
Recurring sporting events established in 1896
Football in Glasgow
Football in Renfrewshire
Football in West Dunbartonshire
Football in East Dunbartonshire
Football in North Lanarkshire
Football in South Lanarkshire
Football in East Renfrewshire
Football in Inverclyde